The Zimapán Dam, also known as Fernando Hiriart Balderrama Dam, is an arch dam on the Moctezuma River about  southwest of Zimapán in Hidalgo state, Mexico. The primary purpose of the dam is hydroelectric power production and it services a 292 MW power station with water.

Background
The dam was funded in part by a $460 million World Bank loan which was approved on 8 June 1989 and covered the Mexico Hydroelectric Development Project which included the Aguamilpa Dam as well. Mexico raised $250 in foreign capital as well.
Construction on the dam began in 1990 and was complete in 1993. Beginning in 1994, the reservoir filled and the power station was operational by 1995. Approximately 3,000 people were displaced and resettled by the construction of both dams in the Mexico Hydroelectric Development Project.

Design
The reservoir is formed by the Tula and San Juan rivers which join in the reservoir to form the Moctezuma River later downstream of the dam. Water from the reservoir is diverted through a  tunnel, bypassing  of the river downstream, before reaching the power station. Water at the power station powers two Pelton turbine-generators before being discharged back into the Moctezuma River. It operates as a peak power plant, operating 4 to 12 hours a day depending on energy demands.

See also

List of power stations in Mexico

References

Dams in Mexico
Hydroelectric power stations in Mexico
Arch dams
Dams completed in 1993
Pánuco River